John Hickey (1751–1795) was an Irish sculptor.

Life

Born in Dublin on 7 November 1751, John was the fourth son of Noah Hickey, a confectioner in Capel Street, and his wife Anne. His older brothers included the artist Thomas Hickey. 

John was apprenticed to a Dublin carver and attended the Dublin Society Schools before travelling to London in 1776 to study further at the Royal Academy Schools. In 1778 he won the Royal Academy Gold Medal for his sculpture Slaughter of the Innocents. He exhibited at the Royal Academy in London from 1777 until death.

Edmund Burke was enthusiastic in promoting his work to create a statue of Henry Grattan in Dublin.

In 1786 he was appointed Sculptor to the Prince of Wales.

He died whilst walking on Oxford Street in London on 12 January 1795.

Works
Monument to William Dowdeswell at Bushley (1775)
Monument to Samuel Foster at Grantham (1778)
Monument to Lord Andrew Archer at Tanworth (1778)
Monument to Mrs Hawkins in St Helen's Church in Abingdon-on-Thames (1780)
Monument to Mary Child at St Nicholas's Church in Abingdon-on-Thames (1782)
Monument to General William Haviland at Penn, Buckinghamshire (1784)
Bust of Lord Loughborough (his patron) (1785)
Monument to John Spencer at Cawthorne (1786)
Bust of Mrs Sarah Siddons as Cassandra (1786) (copy held at the Fitzwilliam Museum)
Monument to Sir Richard Hoare, 1st Baronet in Barnes Parish Church (1787)
Monument to John Story at Leyton, Essex (1787)
Statue of "Time" supporting a huge clock at Carlton House (1788)
Statue of Henry Singleton in St Peter's Church in Drogheda (1788)
Monument to Mrs Burrell in Beckenham (1789)
Monument to Joseph Baker in Chichester Cathedral 1789)
Monument to David La Touche in Delgany, County Wicklow (1790)
Bust of Edmund Burke (1791) destroyed in Blitz 1941 but a plaster copy exists at Wentworth Woodhouse
Bust of Mr Thickness of St Paul's School, London (1792)

References

1751 births
1795 deaths
Irish sculptors
Artists from Dublin (city)